Chain Lightning is a 1927 American silent Western film directed by Lambert Hillyer and written by Lambert Hillyer based upon the novel Brass Commandments by Malcolm Stuart Boylan. The film stars Buck Jones, Diane Ellis, Ted McNamara, Jack Baston, William Welsh, and Martin Faust. The film was released on August 14, 1927, by Fox Film Corporation. The novel that the film is based upon was previously filmed as Brass Commandments (1923).

Cast
 Buck Jones as Steve Lannon
 Diane Ellis as Glory Jackson 
 Ted McNamara as Shorty
 Jack Baston as Campan
 William Welsh as George Clearwater 
 Martin Faust as Bannack 
 William Caress as Tom Yeats
 Gene Cameron as Binghamwell Stokes Hurlbert

References

External links

 
 

1927 films
Fox Film films
1927 Western (genre) films
Films directed by Lambert Hillyer
American black-and-white films
Silent American Western (genre) films
1920s English-language films
1920s American films